Angel Bonanni (born 7 February 1972) is an Israeli actor and model. He is known for his role as Assassin Deacon Mailer in the series Condor, and as Detective Tommy Gibbs in the series Absentia.

Modeling, film and music career
Bonnani began his career as a top model, appearing in fashion campaigns for Jean Paul Gaultier, Donna Karan and Banana Republic as well as appearing in magazines such as Harper’s Bazaar.

Bonanni was cast in English language films and television productions from the 2010s.  Bonanni played Yoni Netanyahu in Seven Days in Entebbe.  He has had lead or recurring roles in Condor, Absentia, Shots Fired and False Flag.

In 2012 Bonanni branched out into music, releasing an album with a collaborator, Gal Padeh. The duo released music in English and used the name Project Passport. Their debut single, 'Borrowed Time' is featured in the 2015 English-language Israeli horror film, JeruZalem.

See also
Israeli fashion
Cinema of Israel
Music of Israel

References

External links 
 

1972 births
Living people
Israeli male film actors
Israeli male television actors
Uruguayan male film actors
Jewish Israeli male actors
Israeli male models
Jewish male models
Uruguayan Jews
Male actors from Montevideo
Uruguayan emigrants to Israel